"Daft Punk Is Playing at My House" is the fifth single from LCD Soundsystem, released on February 21, 2005. The accompanying music video paid tongue-in-cheek homage to Spike Jonze's and Michel Gondry's music videos for Daft Punk's "Da Funk" and "Around the World", respectively. The track reached number one on the UK Dance Chart and number 29 on the UK Singles Chart.

The song was nominated for the 2006 Grammy Award for Best Dance Recording. The song featured in the video games FIFA 06, SSX On Tour, Burnout: Revenge, Forza Motorsport 2 and the Dance Dance Revolution games Hottest Party 3 and X2. The song was also featured in the 2009 film The Limits of Control, the 2012 comedy film Project X, the 2013 comedy-action film The Heat, and the 2019 television miniseries Looking for Alaska. It was also covered by British punk rock band Slaves, as part of their BBC Radio 1 Live Lounge session.

Track listing

CD and 12"
 "Daft Punk Is Playing at My House"
 "Daft Punk Is Playing at My House (Soulwax Shibuya Mix)"

7" vinyl
 A side: "Daft Punk Is Playing at My House"
 B side: "Jump into the Fire"

Personnel
James Murphy – vocals, synthesizers, bass guitar, guitar, drum machine, cowbell

Charts

References

2005 singles
LCD Soundsystem songs
Songs written by James Murphy (electronic musician)
EMI Records singles
Daft Punk